Jill Carter-Hansen (née Carter, born 1941) is a New Zealand-born illustrator, author and filmmaker based in Sydney, Australia. Some of her artwork is held in the permanent collection of Museum of New Zealand Te Papa Tongarewa and Auckland Art Gallery Toi o Tāmaki.

Biography 
Carter-Hansen was born in 1941. She studied art at Elam School of Fine Arts for three years from the age of 17 to 20, then travelled to Europe. On her return she enrolled for a bachelor of fine arts degree in photography and printmaking at the University of Auckland, studying under  Colin McCahon and graduating in 1986.

After graduation, Carter-Hansen exhibited in solo and group shows in Auckland and taught painting, drawing and design, as well as freelancing in photo-journalism. She also worked in design, designing posters and cards for environmental and peace organisations.

In 1987 she moved to Sydney, Australia. She freelanced as a children's book illustrator and photographer and tutored at tertiary art institutes and universities. In 1990 she completed a certificate in animation and began creating short films. In 1996 she completed a master of fine arts degree at Western Sydney University.

Carter-Hansen's work has attracted a number of nominations and awards. Her first children's book, The Elegant Elephant, was a finalist for the Lothian Unpublished Children's Fction Award.  In 2016 and 2018, her work won the Don Banks Short Fiction Award.

Publications 

The Elegant Elephant, 1990 (writer and illustrator), Hodder & Stoughton
The Lonely Gnu, 1991 (writer and illustrator), Random House
Zoe's Zoo, 1992 (writer and illustrator), Hodder & Stoughton
Bearly There, 2012 (illustrator), Windy Hollow Books

Filmography 
 The Messenger, 1991, Visionary Films
 Songs of the Immigrant Bride, 1995, Visionary Films
Eclipse, 1999, Visionary Films

References

1941 births
Living people
New Zealand emigrants to Australia
20th-century New Zealand artists
Western Sydney University alumni
University of Auckland alumni
New Zealand illustrators
New Zealand children's book illustrators
New Zealand women illustrators